Zahava Elenberg is an Australian architect. She co-founded Melbourne-based architecture practice Elenberg Fraser and is the founder of turn-key accommodation fit out and interior furnishing company Move-in.

Early years 
Zahava is the daughter of Anna Schwartz  and artist Joel Elenberg (deceased). She is the step daughter of publisher and developer Morry Schwartz.
Zahava attended Preshil, The Margaret Lyttle Memorial School  and has been a Director of the Preshil School Council and the Preshil School Foundation.

She completed a Bachelor of Architecture at RMIT University and graduated in 1998 with first class honours.

As a child, Zahava was photographed by Melbourne artist Bill Henson and spoke out in support of the artistic value of his work when it was seized by NSW police after a complaint by a child protection campaigner.

Career 
In 1998 Zahava Co-founded Elenberg Fraser Architecture with Callum Fraser, and has risen to prominence in the Australian design scene. Now with offices in Australia and South-East Asia, Elenberg Fraser is one of Australia’s leading practices with a focus on multi-residential and interior design,,.

In 2002 Zahava Established Move-in, a niche business specialising in design-led turn-key furniture solutions and high volume fit-outs for student accommodation, investment, hotel and serviced apartment sectors, and has delivered projects throughout Australia, Asia and the Middle East.

In 2017 Zahava joined the Board of MIFF, the Melbourne International Film Festival, with special responsibilities in Finance, Creative Development and Strategy, Philanthropy and Industry Programs.

Family
Zahava has three children and lives in Melbourne, Australia.

Honors
In 2003, Zahava was awarded the Telstra Young Business Woman of the Year  and in 2005 was named the Ernest & Young Southern Region Young Entrepreneur of the Year. 
Zahava has been an active contributor within the design community and has participated in many panel discussions and conversations around entrepreneurship and design. Following her Telstra award, Elenberg gave the keynote address to 35,000 students, staff and guests at the RMIT University graduation ceremony at Telstra Dome.

References

Australian women architects
1973 births
Living people
Architects from Melbourne
RMIT University alumni
20th-century Australian architects
21st-century Australian architects
Women architects
20th-century Australian women
21st-century Australian women